The Mayor of Chittagong City is the chief executive of the Chattogram City Corporation. The Mayor's office administers all city services, public property, most public agencies, and enforces all city and state laws within Chittagong city.

The Mayor's office is located in Nagar Bhaban; it has jurisdiction over all 41 wards of Chittagong City.

List of officeholders 
Political parties

Other factions

Status

Elections

Election Result 2021

Election Result 2015

Election Result 2010

Election Result 2005

References

Government of Chittagong
 
Chattogram City Corporation

Chittagong